Trachythorax sparaxes is a species of phasmid or stick insect of the genus Trachythorax. It is found in India and Sri Lanka.

References

Phasmatodea
Insects of Asia
Insects described in 1859